In radio propagation, horizontal plane is used to plot an antenna's relative field strength in relation to the ground (which directly affects a station's coverage area) on a polar graph. Normally the maximum of 1.000 or 0 dB is at the top, which is labeled 0o, running clockwise back around to the top at 360°. Other field strengths are expressed as a decimal less than 1.000, a percentage less than 100%, or decibels less than 0 dB. If the graph is of an actual or proposed installation, rotation is applied so that the top is 0o true north.

The vertical plane is used to plot an antenna's relative field strength perpendicular to the ground (which directly affects a station's coverage area) on a polar graph. 

Normally, the maximum of 1.000 or 0 dB is at the side (unless there is beam tilt), which is labeled 0°, to 90° at the top and −90° at the bottom. Other field strengths are expressed as a decimal less than 1.000, a percentage less than 100%, or decibels less than 0 dB.

Most broadcast antennas use either line-of-sight or ground wave propagation (a slight refraction towards the ground) to reach their nearby listeners, and thus want a low angle in the vertical plane.  Short wave transmitters want a somewhat higher elevation angle in the vertical plane to encourage skywave propagation, which would refract or reflect radio waves off the ionosphere and back to the ground at a great distance from the transmitter.

Omnidirectional antennas typically try to limit the range of their vertical plane radiation pattern to concentrate energy over a smaller range and increase gain.

Antennas (radio)